Robert 'Bob' Johnstone (19 March 1942 – 3 June 2001) is a former Australian rules footballer who played with Collingwood in the Victorian Football League (VFL).

Notes

External links 
		
Profile at Collingwood Forever

1942 births
2001 deaths
Australian rules footballers from Victoria (Australia)
Collingwood Football Club players
Minyip Football Club players